Malmö Synagogue is the only synagogue in Malmö, Sweden. It was built in 1903 and designed by the architect John Smedberg. It has an Art Nouveau and Moorish Revival design, which is one of the few synagogues in Europe when most of them were destroyed during Kristallnacht 1938. The services of worship are Orthodox. At the inauguration of Malmö Synagogue, it was Malmö's first non-Christian place of worship. Malmö has two Jewish cemeteries: one section in the northern part of Sankt Pauli kyrkogård and another, newer section in Östra kyrkogården.

The synagogue attracts about 5,000 yearly visitors.

History
It started in 1871 as the fifth Jewish community established in Sweden after Stockholm, Gothenburg, Norrköping and Karlskrona. The community consisted mostly of immigrants from Germany and Poland and had an initial membership base of 251 people. Later on, more Jews fled from Poland, Russia, Ukraine and the Baltic states due to poverty, antisemitism and the threat of being drafted into the Imperial Russian Army for 25 years. The first rabbi Joseph Wohlstein was hired in 1900 and the synagogue was built in 1903. During the Second World War Danish Jews fled to Malmö which expanded the community. During the 1970s, the membership peaked with over 2,000 members which was close to 1% of Malmö's population, mostly Jews from Poland due to a state-led anti-Semitic persecution. Ever since 1990, many members began to feel growing anti-Semitic attitudes and sentiments in Malmö and the community has declined to a membership of about 500. In the year 2011, the Egalitarian community was established in parallel with the Orthodox community.

Events
A Holocaust conference was held in Malmö in October 2021. It was an International Forum for the remembrance of the Holocaust and against antisemitism in Malmö. 44 countries participated, including Sweden's prime minister Stefan Löfven and the King of Sweden Carl Gustaf XVI.

In collaboration with Malmö Municipality, the synagogue opened up as a knowledge center in January of 2022.

Attacks
The synagogue was attacked with explosives on July 23, 2010. The explosion was caused with some kind of fireworks or firecracker containing too little gunpowder to seriously damage the building.

The synagogue was attacked with an explosive device on September 28, 2012, shattering a window.

References

External links
 Malmö Synagogue 

21st-century attacks on synagogues and Jewish communal organizations
Art Nouveau synagogues
Ashkenazi Jewish culture in Sweden
Ashkenazi synagogues
Buildings and structures in Malmö
Modern Orthodox Judaism in Europe
Modern Orthodox synagogues
Moorish Revival synagogues
Orthodox Judaism in Europe
Synagogues in Sweden
Art Nouveau architecture in Sweden
Synagogues completed in 1903